Allan Kellogg Smith (August 17, 1888 – April 9, 1985) was an American attorney  and educator who served as the United States Attorney for the District of Connecticut under Calvin Coolidge.

Biography 
Allan K. Smith was born in Hartford and would go on to live there his entire life. He was educated in Hartford Public High School and then went on to Trinity College. He received his law degree from Harvard Law School. In 1921 he was one of the 3 founders of the Hartford College of Law later this would become University of Connecticut law school). In addition to his teaching he served as the US attorney for the district of Connecticut under Calvin Coolidge. At his alma mater he endowed  the Allan K. Smith Center for Writing and Rhetoric.

References 

1888 births
1985 deaths
20th-century American lawyers
20th-century American educators
Harvard Law School alumni
Lawyers from Hartford, Connecticut
United States Attorneys for the District of Connecticut
Trinity College (Connecticut) alumni